André Eugène Marcel Pourchier (1 June 1897 – 1 September 1944) was a French military officer whose last rank was Lieutenant-Colonel.

Biography 
Pourchier was born in Beuil. He was a chasseurs alpins soldier and a member of his hometown's winter sports club, which was founded in 1924. As a Lieutenant, he was the leader of the national military patrol team at the 1928 Winter Olympics (demonstration event), which finished last.

In 1930 he designed the first ski jumping hill in Beuil. Because of his expertise, he was made the first commander and captain of the newly founded French mountain warfare school École de Haute Montagne (EHM) in Chamonix in 1932. The school was founded for the special training of the ski reconnaissance platoons, which were founded in 1930. During his time at the EHM, he created new techniques of ski warfare, methods of training, and clothing for mountain warfare. He recruited Pierre Dalloz, an engineer who supported his drawings of detailed alpine maps after 1941. During World War II he was captured by the Germans. He was transferred to the concentration camp Natzweiler-Struthof where he died.

In his hometown, his name is listed on a war memorial and a street is named Boulevard Marcel Pourchier.

Bibliography 
 Marcel Pourchier, Edouard Frendo: La Technique de l'Alpinisme, Arthaud, 1943.
 J.-P. Martin: Jusqu’au bout du devoir . Le Lieutenant-Colonel Marcel POURCHIER, in Les Cahiers des Troupes de Montagne, No. 17, June 1999, pp. 30–38.
 Pierre Dalloz: Vérités sur le drame du Vercors, Paris, 1979, Chap. 3.

References 

French Army officers
French military personnel killed in World War II
Military personnel who died in Nazi concentration camps
French people who died in Natzweiler-Struthof concentration camp
Sportspeople from Alpes-Maritimes
French military patrol (sport) runners
Military patrol competitors at the 1928 Winter Olympics
Olympic biathletes of France
Recipients of the Resistance Medal
1897 births
1944 deaths
French military personnel of World War I